Pope Peter III of Alexandria also known as Peter Mongus (from the Greek μογγός mongos, "stammerer") was the 27th Pope of Alexandria and Patriarch of the See of St. Mark.

Biography
After the Council of Chalcedon, Peter Mongus was an ardent adherent of Miaphysitism and deacon of  Timothy Aelurus.  After Timothy expelled the Chalcedonian Patriarch Proterius in 457, Mongus took part in the persecution of the Chalcedonians.

When Timothy Aelurus, who had been expelled in 460 and returned in 475, died in 477, his followers elected Mongus to succeed him.  However, the Byzantine Emperor Zeno brought Timothy Salophakiolos, a Chalcedonian who had supplanted Aelurus before in 460, back to Alexandria and sentenced Mongus to death.

Mongus escaped by flight and remained in hiding until 482.  In the previous year, John Talaia had succeeded Timothy Salophakiolos as patriarch.  However, as Talaia refused to sign Emperor Zeno's Henoticon (which glossed over the Council of Chalcedon), the emperor expelled him and recognized Mongus as the legitimate patriarch on the condition that he would sign the Henoticon.  Mongus complied and after taking possession of the see, he signed the controversial document and sent notice of his succession to his fellow patriarchs.  Patriarch Acacius of Constantinople entered him into his diptychs as patriarch of Alexandria.

Talaia had meanwhile fled to Rome, where he was welcomed by Pope Felix III, who refused to recognize Mongus and defended Talaia's rights in two letters to Acacius.  As Acacius maintained the Henoticon and communion with Mongus, the pope excommunicated the patriarchs in 484.  This Acacian schism lasted until 519.

Mongus became the chief champion of all Miaphysites.  He held a synod to condemn Chalcedon, and desecrated the tombs of his two Chalcedonian predecessors Proterios and Timothy Salophakiolos. When Acacius died in 489, Mongus encouraged his successor Fravitta to maintain the schism with Rome.  Fravitta's successor Euphemius sought to heal the schism by excommunicating Mongus, who however died soon afterwards in 490.

Works
He is said to have written many books, of which however nothing remains.  A pretended correspondence between him and Acacius (in Coptic) is proved to be spurious by Amélineau in the "Memoires publiés par les membres de la mission archéologique française au Caire", IV (Paris, 1888), 196–228.

References

Bibliography
 
 
 "Peter Mongo" in: The Oxford Dictionary of the Christian Church., F. L. Cross and E. A. Livingstone (ed.), London: Oxford University Press, 1974, p. 1074.
 

|-

|-

|-

Peter III
Peter III of Alexandria
Peter III
Peter III
Year of birth unknown